The 2022 Hilbert Hawks football team represented Hilbert College as a member of the independent school during the 2022 NCAA Division III football season. The Hawks, led by first-year head coach Jim Kubiak, played their home games at St. Francis High School in Hamburg, New York.

Schedule

Game summaries

Denison

Willamette

Personnel

Coaching staff

Roster

References

Hilbert
Hilbert Hawks football seasons
Hilbert Hawks football